His Majesty, the Scarecrow of Oz is a 1914 American silent fantasy adventure film directed by J. Farrell MacDonald, and written and produced by L. Frank Baum. It stars Violet MacMillan, Frank Moore, Vivian Reed, Todd Wright, Pierre Couderc, Raymond Russell, and Fred Woodward.

The film had a troubled distribution history; it opened on September 28, 1914, to little success, though it was received as well above average fare by critics of the time. Early in 1915, it was reissued under the title The New Wizard of Oz and was slightly more successful.

The film is loosely based on Baum's 1900 book The Wonderful Wizard of Oz, but in the screenplay, Baum introduced many new characters and a large new story that later became the basis for the 1915 book The Scarecrow of Oz. Similar to The Wonderful Wizard of Oz, the Scarecrow's origin is revealed, although his life is now attributed to "the Spirit of the Corn", who appears as a conventional Hollywood depiction of a Native American.

Plot
King Krewl (Raymond Russell) is a cruel dictator in the Emerald City in the Land of Oz. He wishes to marry his daughter, Princess Gloria (Vivian Reed), to an old courtier named Googly-Goo (Arthur Smollett), but she is in love with Pon, the Gardener's boy (Todd Wright). Krewl employs the Wicked Witch named Mombi (Mai Wells), to freeze the heart of Gloria so she will not love Pon any longer. This she does by pulling out her heart (which looks somewhere between a valentine and a bland representation of a heart without any vessels) and coating it with ice. Meanwhile, a lost little girl from Kansas named Dorothy Gale (Violet MacMillan), is captured by Mombi and imprisoned in her castle. However, Dorothy runs away with the now heartless Gloria, accompanied by Pon and eventually meet the Scarecrow (Frank Moore). Mombi catches up with the travelers and removes the Scarecrow's stuffing, but Dorothy and Pon are able to re-stuff him; Gloria abandons them and wanders off.

They meet the lost little boy, Button-Bright (Mildred Harris). The party travels to the Winkie Country next and arrives at the Tin Castle of the Tin Woodman (Pierre Couderc), who has rusted solid. Mombi reaches the Tin Castle, and the Tin Woodman chops off her head; however, this merely slows her down as she hunts for it and places it back on. Having replaced her head, Mombi encounters Pon and turns him into a kangaroo.

Dorothy, Button-Bright, the Scarecrow and the Tin Woodman escape from Mombi by crossing a river on a raft. But the Scarecrow's barge-pole gets stuck in the river bed and leaves him stranded, until he is rescued by a bird. At one point in this sequence, the Scarecrow slides down the pole into the river, resulting a brief "underwater" sequence featuring puppet fish and a mermaid; throughout, the Scarecrow makes asides to the camera, mostly without [intertitles

The party encounters the Wizard (J. Charles Haydon), who tricks Mombi by letting the group hide in the Red Wagon, pulled by the sawhorse; when Mombi attempts to follow them, the group escape out the back of the wagon. The four companions meet the Cowardly Lion, who joins them. The Wizard traps Mombi in a container of "Preserved Sandwitches" and paints out the "sand" and the plural, carrying her away in his pocket. The Scarecrow, taking a barrage of arrows, tosses Krewl's soldiers over the battlements to deal with the Cowardly Lion, who cannot climb the rope ladder over the city wall. With the support of the people, the Scarecrow is easily able to depose King Krewl. The Wizard releases Mombi, and compels her to restore Pon to his normal form and unfreeze Gloria’s Heart.

Cast

Damage history
The opening reel was lost for many years. While it was eventually recovered in the 1990s, it did not contain the opening titles; Dick Martin's titles, designed in the 1960s, continued to be used, which falsely stated that Baum was the director of the film, misspelled Mai Wells' name, and left out Smollett's credit entirely.

References

External links

 
 

Films based on American novels
Films based on fantasy novels
Films based on The Wizard of Oz
American black-and-white films
1914 films
American silent feature films
Paramount Pictures films
Films directed by J. Farrell MacDonald
Works by L. Frank Baum
Articles containing video clips
American fantasy adventure films
1910s fantasy adventure films
1910s English-language films
1910s American films
Silent fantasy adventure films
Silent American children's films
Silent American fantasy films